Shock may refer to:

Common uses

Collective noun
Shock, a historic commercial term for a group of 60, see English numerals#Special names
 Stook, or shock of grain, stacked sheaves

Healthcare
 Shock (circulatory), circulatory medical emergency
 Cardiogenic shock, resulting from dysfunction of the heart 
 Distributive shock, resulting from an abnormal distribution of blood flow
 Septic shock, a result of severe infection
 Toxic shock syndrome, a specific type of severe infection
 Anaphylactic shock, a result of severe allergic reaction
 Neurogenic shock, due to a high spinal cord injury disrupting the sympathetic nervous system
 Hypovolemic shock, resulting from an insufficient blood volume
 Hemorrhagic shock, from a large volume lost to bleeding
Obstructive shock, resulting from mechanical obstruction of blood flow
 Cold shock response of organisms to sudden cold, especially cold water
 Electric shock
 Defibrillation, electric shock to restore heart rhythm
 Electroconvulsive therapy or shock treatment, psychiatric treatment 
 Hydrostatic shock, from ballistic impact
 Insulin shock or diabetic hypoglycemia, from  too much insulin
 Insulin shock therapy, purposely induced insulin shock, obsolete therapy
 Osmotic shock, caused by  solute concentration around a cell
 Psychological shock or acute stress reaction, to terrifying events
 Shell shock, soldiers' reaction to battle trauma

Physical sciences
 Shock (mechanics), a sudden acceleration or deceleration 
 Shock absorber
 Shock mount
 Shock wave
 Oblique shock
 Shock (fluid dynamics), an abrupt discontinuity in the flow field
 Bow shock, in planetary science and astronomy
 Electric shock
 Shock chlorination of water to reduce bacteria and algae
 Shocks and discontinuities (magnetohydrodynamics)
 Thermal shock

Social sciences
 Shock (economics), an unpredicted event that affects an economy
Demand shock
 Supply shock
 Culture shock, in social psychology
 Shock value, in popular psychology

Places
 Shock, West Virginia, an unincorporated US community

People

People with the given name or nickname
 Shock or Harry Del Rios (born 1973), American professional wrestler
 Shock G or Gregory E. Jacobs (1963–2021), American musician and rapper

People with the surname
 Everett Shock, American geochemist
 Maurice Shock (born 1936), British educator
 Molly Shock, American film editor
 Ron Shock (1942–2012), American comedian and storyteller
 Stefie Shock (born 1969), Canadian musician
 Susy Shock (born 1968), Argentine actress, writer, and singer
 Viki Shock (born 1975), Czech writer and artist

Arts, entertainment, and media

Categories and genres
 Shock art
 Shock jock, deliberately offensive broadcaster
 Shock rock, a genre of rock music
 Shock site, deliberately offensive website

Films
 The Shock (film), a 1923 silent film
 Shock (1934 film), starring Ralph Forbes
 Shock (1946 film), starring Vincent Price
 Shock (1977 film), an Italian film
 Shock (2004 film), a Tamil film starring Prashanth Thyagarajan
 Shock (2006 film), a Telugu film

Music

Groups and labels
 Shock (troupe), an English music/mime/dance group
 Shock Records, an Australian record label

Artists
 Culture Shock (musician), British producer and DJ
 Minotaur Shock, British electronica musician
 ShockOne, Australian producer and DJ
 Stefie Shock, Canadian singer-songwriter

Albums
 Shock (The Motels album), 1985
 Shock (Tesla album), 2019

Songs
 "Shock" (Beast song), a 2010 song by South Korean boy band Beast
 "Shock" (Fear Factory song), a 1998 song by Fear Factory
 "Shock" (The Motels song), 1985
 "Shock", a 1987 song by The Psychedelic Furs from Midnight to Midnight
 "Shock!", a 2010 song by the Japanese band Cute
 "Shock (Unmei)", a 2009 song by Meisa Kuroki

Other arts, entertainment, and media
 Elektra Shock, New Zealand drag performer
 Shock: Social Science Fiction, role-playing game
 Shock Theater, a 1950s and 1960s American television film series
 Shock (novel), a 2001 novel by Robin Cook
 Shock (comics), a Marvel Comics supervillain
 Shock (journal), a medical journal
 Shock (musical), a Japanese stage musical series
 The Shock (TV program), an Arabic-language hidden-camera show
 Shock Gibson, a fictional comic book superhero

Military
 Shock and awe, display of force to destroy an opponent's will to fight
 Shock tactics, a close quarter battle tactic
 Shock troops, who apply shock tactics

Sports and teams
 San Francisco Shock, a professional Overwatch League team
 Shock Linwood, American college running back
 Spokane Shock, an arena football team based in Spokane, Washington, US
 Tulsa Shock, a WNBA professional women's basketball team
 Detroit Shock, previous name of Tulsa Shock

See also
 Schock (disambiguation)
 Shock therapy (disambiguation)
 Shocked (disambiguation)
 Shocker (disambiguation)
 Shocking (disambiguation)